The Buzz on Maggie is an American animated television series created by Dave Polsky for Disney Channel. The series centers on an ambitious and expressive tween fly named Maggie Pesky and her family and friends. The show is set in Stickyfeet, a city for insects located in a junkyard. While conceptualizing the series, Polsky wanted it to contain a playful aspect at adolescence and director Dave Wasson formed the overall look of the characters, being heavily influenced by early Walt Disney cartoon shorts. The Buzz on Maggie was Disney's first series to be fully animated in Adobe Flash, a process done by Bardel Entertainment and Future Thought Productions. The series was produced in widescreen, but was broadcast in 4:3 aspect ratio due to Disney Channel's lack of an HD feed at the time.

The Buzz on Maggie premiered on June 17, 2005 and received positive reviews from television critics, many of whom praised its humor, voice acting and writing. Despite this, only one season was produced and the series aired its final episode on May 27, 2006. The theme song “Just the Way I Am”, performed by Canadian singer Skye Sweetnam, was also met with critical praise and a Daytime Emmy Award nomination in 2006. During its run, The Buzz on Maggie also received an Annie Award nomination for its character design.

Plot

The Buzz on Maggie follows Maggie Pesky (Jessica DiCicco), an expressive 13-year-old fly and her family; parents Chauncey (Brian Doyle-Murray) and Frieda (Susan Tolsky); brothers Aldrin (David Kaufman) and Pupert (Thom Adcox); and sister Bella (Tara Strong), who is still a maggot. The family resides in an old milk carton in a suburban fly metropolis called Stickyfeet, which is located in a dump. Maggie has an ambitious and adventurous personality and aspires to become a rock star. Her approach to life often suffers unexpected consequences that puts herself in jeopardy, as she often follows her own impulses although they go against the rules or her parents' wishes. However, she ultimately learns her lesson, which was one of the core themes for the show's conception.

Maggie attends a junior high school called Buzzdale Academy with her best friend Rayna Cartflight (Cree Summer) and nemesis Dawn Swatworthy (Tara Strong). The school's staff include the sneaky Principal Peststrip (Jeff Bennett), pompous Mr. Bugspit (Curtis Armstrong) and gruff Mrs. Wingston (Candi Milo). The Buzz on Maggie uses a slapstick comedy style and relies slightly on gross-out humor. It also includes several insect aspects, such as flies' appetite for spoiled and rotten food. The show features various references to pop culture and common themes, such as sibling rivalry and peer pressure, from a fly's point of view.

Production

The concept of The Buzz on Maggie was created by Dave Polsky, a former writer on Scary Movie 2 and South Park. In an early interview for Animation World Network, he explained that the series utilizes a playful aspect at adolescence, naming it "individuality vs. conformity". He said, "Maggie must learn how to pursue her agenda without alienating those she cares about. More often than not, Maggie learns that it is difficult to negotiate life on her terms without burning bridges." Dave Wasson, the creator of the animated series Time Squad, served as the director, and executively produced the series with Polsky, while Laura Perkins Brittain was the co-executive producer.

Wasson formed Maggie's character design and supported the use of Adobe Flash for animating the series. He told Animation Magazine that he was convinced Flash was a "good way to go" as he had had previous experience with the program, such as commercials and short films. The series became Disney's first to be fully animated in Flash. Following the cancellation of Kids' WB's ¡Mucha Lucha!, many animators from that series were hired to work on The Buzz on Maggie. For the character designs, Wasson was heavily influenced by early cartoon shorts by Tex Avery, Warner Bros. and Walt Disney. He noted that the characters in The Buzz on Maggie have "a lot of 1930s touches" and wear white gloves, which is a direct homage to the cartoon shorts. The characters also have anime-inspired designs with oversized heads and large eyes. Wasson stated that the concept of Maggie living in a dump gave him a "lot of visual opportunities". Jorge Gutierrez supervised the character design and Roman Laney supervised location and prop design in addition to background paint. The animation was done by Bardel Entertainment and Future Thought Productions.

The series' theme song "Just the Way I Am" was composed by Bob Thiele Jr. and Dillon O'Brian, and performed by Canadian singer Skye Sweetnam. The song is about pride, acceptance and empowerment. Adam Berry did the show's score. Charlie Adler voice directed The Buzz on Maggie and helmed voice casting with Jamie Thomason. Newcomer Jessica DiCicco was cast as Maggie, her first main voice role on a television series, preceding her role on Loonatics Unleashed, which premiered the same year. The rest of the main cast included David Kaufman, Thom Adcox, Cree Summer, Brian Doyle-Murray and Susan Tolsky. Tara Strong voiced Maggie's nemesis Dawn, among other minor characters. The series had a few guest voice actors, such as Laraine Newman, Paul Rodriguez, and Jon Polito.

Release
The Buzz on Maggie premiered on Disney Channel on Friday June 17, 2005, At 8:00PM And 8:30PM with two back-to-back episodes. The next week, it moved to its regular timeslot in the channel's weekend block. Each half-hour episode consists of two different segments. The Buzz on Maggie aired for one season, comprising 21 half-hour episodes. The final episode, containing the segments "Synchronized Flying" and "Roach Hotel", aired on May 27, 2006.

In fall 2005, The Buzz on Maggie was picked up by sister network ABC. The network began airing reruns of the show from September 17, 2005, to January 21, 2006 on the Saturday morning block ABC Kids. According to Nielsen Media Research, the ABC premiere acquired a 1.6 rating in the Kids 2–11 demographic, and a 1.4 rating in Tweens 9–14, as well as a 7% share in both demographics. The premiere was that timeslot's highest-rated broadcast in nearly three months across the block's three key demographics, Kids 2–11, Kids 6–11 and Tweens 9–14. During the ABC Kids broadcasts, the series carried an E/I designation. The series is not yet available for streaming on Disney+.

Episodes
All episodes were directed by Dave Wasson.

Reception

Critical response

The Buzz on Maggie received positive reviews from television critics. Jeff Hidek of Star-News viewed it as "Miss Spider's Sunny Patch Friends meets The Proud Family" and named it "by far the most entertaining of this summer's new offerings". Roger Catlin of Hartford Courant wrote that it stands out from other shows on Disney Channel by "being a little sassy and sharp, and a whole lot funnier than most of [the channel's] stuff". He wrote that the channel "gets back into the race dominated by Cartoon Network offerings ... and a Nickelodeon roster ... with an offering just as hip and well designed". Catlin commended the voice acting and the "sharp" writing, stating that the former factor "hit[s] the humor home". The Philadelphia Inquirer critic David Hiltbrand noted that although the show includes "a little" gross-out humor, "it's reasonably tasteful by adolescent standards". He concluded, "The animation ... is a little substandard, but the premise is nicely maintained." AllMovie's Hal Erickson deemed the fly concept unoriginal, but said that the show "set[s] itself apart from such earlier endeavors". Erickson regarded Maggie's "strong, forceful attitude" a positive role model for kids. A critic for Observer-Reporter deemed it "suitably silly", and Robert Lloyd of Los Angeles Times called it "delightful".

At the time of its premiere, Gail Pennington of St. Louis Post-Dispatch named the show one of the "Tops of the night". Diana Dawson, writing for Spartanburg Herald-Journal, considered it an "inspiring show for fun-loving tweens". Kevin McDonough of Lawrence Journal-World wrote that The Buzz on Maggie "strikes a decent balance between cartoon anarchy and Disney's you-go-girl sermonizing." He praised the title character's "bugged-out status", writing that it prevents the stories from being "too cute". Jeanne Spreier of The Dallas Morning News graded The Buzz on Maggie with a B and regarded it as "perfect cartooning" for children. She wrote, "[The show's] relatively simple plots, with equally simple resolutions and very clean dialogue, create fine cartoons for a schoolkid's late-afternoon respite." Similarly, the show's theme song "Just the Way I Am" received positive reactions; Hiltbrand called it "great", and Dawson wrote that "every episode explodes with the dynamic theme song".

Awards and nominations
In 2005, Jorge Gutierrez was nominated for the Best Character Design in an Animated Television Production award at the 33rd Annie Awards, for his work in the episode "Bella Con Carny". However, he lost to Ernie Gilbert from The Fairly OddParents. The next year, Bob Thiele Jr. and Dillon O'Brian received a nomination for Outstanding Original Song for the theme song "Just the Way I Am" at the 33rd Daytime Emmy Awards, but lost to the song "Sunshine" from The Young and the Restless.

References

External links
 
 

2000s American animated television series
2000s American children's comedy television series
2005 American television series debuts
2006 American television series endings
American children's animated comedy television series
American flash animated television series
Disney Channel original programming
English-language television shows
Animated television series about insects
Television series by Disney Television Animation